Diathraustodes is a genus of moths of the family Crambidae.

Species
Diathraustodes amoenialis (Christoph, 1881)
Diathraustodes fulvofusa Hampson in Leech & South, 1901
Diathraustodes leucotrigona Hampson, 1896
Diathraustodes similis Hampson, 1903

References

Acentropinae
Crambidae genera
Taxa named by George Hampson